Annanukku Jai is a 1989 Indian Tamil-language film, directed by Gangai Amaran. The film stars Arjun Sarja and Seetha.

Cast 

Arjun Sarja
Seetha
Kiruthika 
Radha Ravi
Shanmugasundaram
Vennira Aadai Moorthy
Chinni Jayanth
Charle
M. S. Bhaskar 
Ganthimathi

Soundtrack
Soundtrack was composed by Ilaiyaraaja.

References

1989 films
Films scored by Ilaiyaraaja
1980s Tamil-language films
Films directed by Gangai Amaran